Robert Childers Barton (14 March 1881 – 10 August 1975) was an Anglo-Irish politician, Irish nationalist and farmer who participated in the negotiations leading up to the signature of the Anglo-Irish Treaty. His father was Charles William Barton and his mother was Agnes Alexandra Frances Childers. His wife was Rachel Warren of Boston, daughter of Fiske Warren. His double first cousin and close friend was Erskine Childers.

Early life
He was born in County Wicklow into a wealthy Irish Protestant land-owning family; namely of Glendalough House. Educated in England at Rugby and Oxford, he became an officer in the Royal Dublin Fusiliers on the outbreak of World War I. He was stationed in Dublin during the 1916 Easter Rising and came into contact with many of its imprisoned leaders in the aftermath while on duty at Richmond Barracks. He resigned his commission in protest at the heavy-handed British government suppression of the revolt. He then joined the Irish Republican Brotherhood.

Family
Charles William Barton (father) was born on 13 July 1836. He married Agnes Alexandra Frances Childers, daughter of Rev. Canon Charles Childers, on 26 October 1876. He died on 3 October 1890 at age 54. Robert's two younger brothers, Erskine and Thomas, died in the British Army during World War I.

Politics
At the 1918 general election to the British House of Commons Barton was elected as the Sinn Féin member for Wicklow West. In common with all Sinn Féin members, he boycotted the Westminster parliament and sat instead in Dáil Éireann (the First Dáil). Arrested in February 1919 for sedition, he escaped from Mountjoy Prison on St. Patrick's Day (leaving a note to the governor explaining that, owing to the discomfort of his cell, the occupant felt compelled to leave, and requesting the governor to keep his luggage until he sent for it). He was appointed as Director of Agriculture in the Dáil Ministry in April 1919. He was recaptured in January 1920 and sentenced to three years' imprisonment, but was released under the general amnesty of July 1921.

In May of that year, prior to his release, he was elected as a Sinn Féin member for Kildare–Wicklow in the 1921 Irish election to the House of Commons of Southern Ireland. Once again all Sinn Féin members boycotted this parliament, sitting as the Second Dáil. In August 2921, he was appointed to cabinet as Secretary for Economic Affairs.

Barton was one of the Irish plenipotentiaries to travel to London for the Anglo-Irish Treaty negotiations. His cousin was a secretary to the delegation. Barton reluctantly signed the Treaty on 6 December 1921, defending it "as the lesser of two outrages forced upon me and between which I had to choose".

Although he had signed the Treaty and voted for it in the Dáil, he stood for election in June 1922 for Anti-Treaty Sinn Féin, the only TD who had voted for the Treaty to do so, and won a seat in the Third Dáil. In common with other Anti-Treaty TDs, he did not take his seat. In October 1922 he was appointed Minister for Economic Affairs in de Valera's "Emergency Government", a shadow government in opposition to the Provisional Government and the later the Executive Council of the Irish Free State. Barton's memoir of this period was completed in 1954, and can be seen on the Bureau of Military History website. He was arrested and interned for most of the war at the Curragh Camp.

He was defeated at the 1923 general election, and retired from politics for the law, practicing as a barrister. He later became a judge. He was chairman of the Agricultural Credit Corporation from 1934 to 1954. Barton died at home in County Wicklow on 10 August 1975, at the age of 94, the last surviving signatory of the Anglo-Irish Treaty. Éamon de Valera died only nineteen days later, on 29 August 1975.

Interview
In 1969, RTÉ Television interviewed Barton, alongside Ernest Blythe and James Ryan about the 1918 general election.

Glendalough House
Glendalough House, run by Barton for over 70 years right up until his death, is still considered one of Ireland's most notable properties; alongside nearby Powerscourt Estate. The house was the center of numerous political meetings and gatherings from 1910 to 1922. It's also been featured as a location in many large Hollywood films including Excalibur Saving Private Ryan and Braveheart.

Barton's great-great-grandfather, Thomas Barton, also of Glendalough House, was the founder and owner of the award-winning Langoa & Barton vineyards in France. Since 1836, the vineyards have been under the control of the Barton family. The Châteaux Langoa & Léoville Barton passed to the Straffan branch of the Barton family and are currently managed by Anthony Frederick Barton and his daughter, Lilian Anna Barton. He was preceded by his uncle, Major Hugh Ronald Barton ("Ronald"), chairman, Barton & Guestier, wine shippers, Bordeaux. The Straffan Estate was sold by Captain Frederick Bertram Barton ("Derick") in 1949, a father to Anthony Frederick and brother to Ronald. He lived in Blackrock, County Dublin thereafter.

References

1881 births
1975 deaths
Politicians from County Wicklow
Irish Protestants
Protestant Irish nationalists
People educated at Rugby School
Royal Dublin Fusiliers officers
Early Sinn Féin TDs
Members of the 1st Dáil
Members of the 2nd Dáil
Members of the 3rd Dáil
Members of the Parliament of the United Kingdom for County Wicklow constituencies (1801–1922)
UK MPs 1918–1922
Childers family
20th-century Irish judges
British Army personnel of World War I
People of the Irish Civil War (Anti-Treaty side)
The Irish Press people
Ministers for Agriculture (Ireland)